Lycée Jacques Prévert is a senior high school/sixth-form college in Boulogne-Billancourt, Hauts-de-Seine, France, in the Paris metropolitan area.

The school, the first senior high/sixth-form in Boulogne-Billancourt, opened in September 1968. Prior to formally adopting the name Lycée Jacques Prévert it had been called by several other names such as Lycée de Boulogne and Lycée Paul Bert. Its current building opened in 1989 and was extensively renovated around 2010.

References

External links
 Lycée Jacques Prévert 
 BCPST-Prévert 

Lycées in Hauts-de-Seine
1968 establishments in France
Educational institutions established in 1968